Magda M. was a Polish soap opera which aired on TVN from 2005 to 2007.

Cast members

Poland Television Ratings

Plot
Magdalena Miłowicz is a young lawyer who seems to be a little lost in her love life, until she meets Peter, a man who also turns out to be a lawyer. After they met, they fall madly in love.

Nonetheless, Peter has chosen to fight for Magda's affection. Once he wins Magda's love, he gets very sick with an illness, requiring him to go to the United States for treatment. However, he chose not tell Magda, unwillingly hurting her in the process.

When he gets well and comes back, he tries to win her back. But for leaving her without a word, she wants him out of her life, saying that she has other men to choose from. But the question is—is Peter Magda's true love, a love that she has denied herself?

External links
 Magda M. – official site(PL)

Polish television soap operas
2005 Polish television series debuts
Television shows set in Warsaw
2007 Polish television series endings
TVN (Polish TV channel) original programming